Someday is Younha's second Korean album, released on August 28, 2008.  It is her first album to include an entirely English track (My Song and...).

Track listing
 Gossip Boy
 기억 "Memory"(feat. Tablo) - Rap Mix version 
 Hero
 Someday
 텔레파시 "Telepathy"
 Rain & The Bar
 빗소리 "The Sound Of Rain"
 Rainbow
 Best Friend
 Strawberry Days
 For Catharina
 미워하다 "Hating"
 My Song and...
 울지마요 "Don't Cry"
 기억 (Original Mix) "Memory (Original Mix)"
 텔레파시 (Instrumental) "Telepathy (Instrumental)"
 미워하다 (Instrumental) "Hating (Instrumental)"

Notes

References

External links
 Younha Official Website (Korean language)

2008 albums
Younha albums
Kakao M albums